Berycopsia is an extinct genus of prehistoric bony fish that lived from the Turonian.

See also

 Prehistoric fish
 List of prehistoric bony fish

References

Late Cretaceous fish
Polymixiiformes
Prehistoric ray-finned fish genera